Helicoptering can refer to the actions of a helicopter, or by analogy to:
the anemochoric (wind-based) dispersal of autorotating samara
the hovering behavior of a helicopter parent